Ferraris is an Italian surname. Notable people with the surname include:

 Adalgiso Ferraris (1890–1968), Italian-born British musician and composer
 Amalia Ferraris (c.1830–1904), Italian ballerina
 Antonio de Ferraris (c.1444–1517), Greek-Italian scholar and doctor 
 Attilio Ferraris (1904–1947), Italian footballer
 Claudia Ferraris (born 1988), Italian beauty pageant winner
 David Ferraris (born 1963), South African racehorse trainer, now in Hong Kong
 Galileo Ferraris (1847–1897), Italian physicist and electrical engineer
 Ines Maria Ferraris (1882–1971), Italian operatic soprano 
 Jan Ferraris (born 1947), American professional golfer 
 Joseph de Ferraris (1726–1814), Austrian general and cartographer
 Lucius Ferraris (18th century), Italian Franciscan canonist
 Maurizio Ferraris (born 1956), Italian philosopher and academic
 Pietro Ferraris  (1912–1991), Italian footballer
 Zoë Ferraris American novelist

See also 
 
 Ferrara (surname)
 Ferrari (surname)
 Ferraro
 Ferrera
 Ferrero

References 

Italian-language surnames